John Barry MacKenzie (born August 16, 1941) is a Canadian retired ice hockey player. He played for Canada at the 1964 and 1968 Winter Olympics, winning one bronze medal in 1968, as well as in three World Championships, winning a further two more bronzes. He would also play 6 games in the National Hockey League with the Minnesota North Stars during the 1968–69 season.

After his retirement, MacKenzie became the first coach hired by the Sudbury Wolves of the Ontario Hockey Association and became principal and coach at the Athol Murray College of Notre Dame in Wilcox, Saskatchewan. He eventually worked with the Minnesota Wild as a player development coordinator.

He was inducted into the International Ice Hockey Federation Hall of Fame in 1999.

Career
At the age of 15, MacKenzie played for the Weston Dukes with the goal of joining the Toronto Marlies before he was encouraged by Father David Bauer to attend St. Michael's College School. He played at St. Michael during the 1960–61 season where they captured the Memorial Cup. After the teams Memorial Cup run, Father David Bauer became the head coach of the University of British Columbia men's ice hockey team, the UBC Thunderbirds. For the 1962–1963 season, MacKenzie, along with Ken Broderick, Dave Chambers, and Terry O'Malley enrolled at the University of British Columbia where they played for the UBC Thunderbirds.

From there he joined the Canadian National Team for the 1964 Winter Olympics and 1968 Winter Olympics, winning one bronze medal. He earned the chance to turn professional by playing six games with the Minnesota North Stars in the National Hockey League but failed to make the roster full-time.

He joined the Sudbury Wolves of the Ontario Hockey Association as a coach but lasted only half a season. In 1974, he moved to Japan for three seasons to play with the Seibu Ice Hockey Club but eventually returned to Canada to coach the Athol Murray College of Notre Dame hockey team. Alongside Terry O'Malley, MacKenzie redefined their midget hockey program and guided them to the 1988 Air Canada Cup Championship. In 1992, MacKenzie was named president of Notre Dame College. MacKenzie eventually left Notre Dame to work with the Minnesota Wild as their player development coordinator.

In 1999, MacKenzie was inducted into the International Ice Hockey Federation Hall of Fame. In 2016, he was inducted into The Saskatchewan Hockey Hall of Fame as a builder.

Personal life
MacKenzie earned his Bachelor of Education from the University of British Columbia and a Master of Science from Eastern Michigan University. The 1962–63 University of British Columbia men's ice hockey team was inducted into the UBC Sports Hall of Fame in 2012.

Career statistics

Regular season and playoffs

International

References

External links
 
 IIHF Hockey Hall of Fame bio

1941 births
Living people
Canadian ice hockey defencemen
Ice hockey players at the 1964 Winter Olympics
Ice hockey players at the 1968 Winter Olympics
Eastern Michigan University alumni
Japan Ice Hockey League players
Medalists at the 1968 Winter Olympics
Memphis South Stars players
Minnesota North Stars players
Minnesota Wild executives
IIHF Hall of Fame inductees
Olympic bronze medalists for Canada
Olympic medalists in ice hockey
Olympic ice hockey players of Canada
Ontario Hockey Association Senior A League (1890–1979) players
Ice hockey people from Toronto
Toronto St. Michael's Majors players
University of British Columbia alumni
UBC Thunderbirds ice hockey players